Greg Nance (born September 29, 1988) is an American entrepreneur, mountaineer, and ultramarathon runner. Nance is the co-founder and Board Chairman of Moneythink, the founder and CEO of Dyad Mentorship, an Advisory Board Member at the Chicago Project on Security and Threats (CPOST), a Board of Directors Member of the Harry S Truman Scholars Association, and a Board of Directors Member of the Gates Cambridge Alumni Association.

As CEO of Dyad Mentorship, Nance has helped students earn over $27 million in university scholarships. Nance has received numerous awards for his public service and business leadership including recognition from the Jefferson Awards for Public Service as a "Globe Changer" in 2011 and from The Diplomatic Courier as one of the "Top 99 Foreign Policy Leaders Under 33" in 2013. Nance was selected to attend the 2017 World Economic Forum in Davos, Switzerland. On January 19, 2017 The New York Times covered Nance's announcement of Dyad's plan to initiate a pro bono mentorship program for Syrian refugees.

Nance rose to greater prominence in 2016 following his selection as the Seattle Seahawks "12 Ambassador." Nance became the face of Delta Air Lines' Pacific Northwest marketing campaign in which his ultramarathon running and lifelong Seahawks fandom was featured in TV commercials. Nance's ultramarathon highlights include 250 km crossings of China's Gobi Desert and Chile's Atacama Desert where he was the top American finisher. He is best known for completing 7 marathons in 7 days on 7 continents while battling stomach flu in February 2019.

Early life and education

Nance was a multi-sport athlete on Bainbridge Island, Washington, and played baseball, basketball, soccer, and football. He competed in varsity tennis and baseball before running cross country and track during his senior year of high school. Nance became a “stand out” runner, “excelling in track." Nance grew up rooting for Seattle sports teams. According to a March 2019 feature by the Seattle Seahawks, “Nance was born into a Seahawks family as his dad was a beer vendor at the Kingdome during the 1983 and ’84 seasons. His fandom started at a young age, wearing his number 12 Seahawks jersey to peewee football practice.” 

Nance attended Bainbridge High School outside Seattle, where he served as class president and was the 2007 Washington State debate champion. He received an appointment to the United States Military Academy at West Point but chose to attend the University of Chicago, after being offered a scholarship. During college, Nance worked odd jobs including splitting wood, landscaping, roofing, and painting houses.

While a junior at the University of Chicago, Nance was elected Student Government President and earned the 2010 Harry S. Truman Scholarship from Washington State. In 2011 Nance earned a Gates Scholarship to the Cambridge Judge Business School. In an interview with Cambridge University in August 2014, Nance credited the example of his parents' public service in Seattle and his grandfather's courage during the Battle of Iwo Jima as inspirations, stating that "I learned my leadership values around the dinner table."

Career

Moneythink

In October 2008, Nance, Shashin Chokshi, David Chen, Morgan Hartley and Ted Gonder established the "American Investment Fellows" club at the University of Chicago based on Nance's idea to send students from the university's investment club into local high schools to teach personal finance workshops. After a successful pilot program, the initiative was rebranded as Moneythink and began to spread to college campuses across the U.S. To date, Moneythink's 1,000 college volunteers have taught more than 15,000 high school students to make and manage money in over 30 communities.

In 2012 Moneythink was recognized by the Obama Administration as a "Champion of Change," and won the $100,000 top prize at the 2013 MassChallenge global entrepreneurship competition. In 2013, The Harvard Business Review named Moneythink a "meaningful place to work" and the American Banker featured Moneythink as one of the "Top 20 FinTech Companies to Watch." In 2015, Moneythink was represented by CEO Ted Gonder on the President's Advisory Council on Financial Capability for Young Americans. Moneythink has raised $650,000 from JPMorgan Chase and received financial support from Google, CFSI, Capital One, PwC, Blackstone, and American Express, among others.

Nance currently serves as Moneythink's Chairman of the Board. In recognition of his work, Nance was named a "Globe Changer" at the 2011 Jefferson Awards for Public Service and received the "2019 Young Alumni Service Award" from the University of Chicago.

According to a 2019 University of Chicago profile, Nance's passion for expanding educational opportunities was sparked by volunteering as a youth mentor at high schools in Chicago's Woodlawn, South Shore, and Hyde Park neighborhoods. Reflecting on the inspiration behind his work, Nance stated that “I was only able to attend my dream schools, UChicago and Cambridge, with the help of scholarships. I'm on a mission to pay it forward.”

Dyad Mentorship

In 2012, Nance founded Dyad Mentorship (formerly ChaseFuture) while a Gates Scholar at Cambridge University. Dyad is a mentorship platform that guides students through the university admissions process with a free online library of instructional articles and videos and a digital workspace for face-to-face video-conferences and document reviews. To date, Dyad has helped students earn over $27 million in scholarships and helped over 2,000 clients from 25 countries including China, India, Egypt, Colombia, Honduras, Japan, Malaysia, Australia, France, England, and America. Dyad also advised one of China's four inaugural Rhodes Scholarship recipients in 2015. In a 2019 interview with Cambridge University, Nance explained that Dyad "aim[s] to level the playing field with free content, scholarship advising, and affordable one-on-one coaching.”

The organization has raised $1 million in venture capital funding from 500 Startups, SOSV, Artesian Capital Management, Banyan Partners, Harbor Pacific Capital, and several angel investors. Dyad's Advisory Board includes the former CEO of McDonald's, former Secretary of the U.S. Air Force, former President of the Association of American Rhodes Scholars, and a National Program Chairman for 7 U.S. Presidents. The organization has been featured in Forbes, TechCrunch, University World News, and The World Economic Forum Agenda. Dyad was honored as "People's Choice for Asia's Best Startup" at the 2015 Echelon Summit.

Nance currently serves as Dyad's Chairman and CEO. In recognition of his work, The Diplomatic Courier named Nance an "Innovator" and one of the "Top 99 Foreign Policy Leaders Under 33" in September 2013. The New York Times and South China Morning Post both quoted Nance in their news coverage of the historic Baidu and CloudFlare global Internet joint venture launch on September 13, 2015.

Ultramarathon Running

Origins

Nance began running as a senior in high school and completed his first marathon in college, qualifying for the 2011 and 2012 Boston Marathon. Nance ran his first ultramarathon, a 50 km on the UK's Jurassic Coast, in December 2011 and finished 10th place. He has since completed numerous international ultramarathons, including in Chile, Kazakhstan, the Philippines, Singapore, Malaysia, Vietnam, China, Hong Kong, Taiwan, and the UK.

Nance finished a 250 km ultramarathon across the Gobi Desert in June 2014. Nance's Gobi crossing was profiled by Adventure World Magazine where he credited the encouragement of fellow runners and the medical team's professionalism for enabling him to finish the 250 km footrace despite injuring his knee halfway. He published an essay on his experience running across the Gobi Desert and wrote that "we aim to find our limits and push past them."

Nance, along with his father Mike Nance, completed the six-stage 250 km Atacama Crossing in October 2018. In a post-race interview, Nance stated “We battled towering sand dunes, treacherous salt flats and river crossings, 10,000-plus-foot elevation, and scorching 116 [degree] heat.” Mike Nance was the second-oldest finisher and Greg Nance was the top American finisher in the field.

Nance is sponsored by Brooks Running, Clif Bar, Delta Air Lines, and Wentworth. In 2017 Nance began publishing instructional articles on ultramarathon training and recovery for Brooks Running.

World Marathon Challenge

In February 2019 Nance completed the World Marathon Challenge where he ran seven marathons in seven days on seven continents. Beginning with a marathon in Novo, Antarctica, Nance then ran consecutive marathons in Cape Town, South Africa; Perth, Australia; Dubai, UAE; Madrid, Spain; Santiago, Chile; and Miami, USA. In addition to running the 183.4 miles (295 km), Nance and fellow competitors also traveled over 23,000 miles in the air to reach each start line. Only 104 people had ever completed the challenge (compared to over 4,000 climbers who have summited Mt. Everest or 500 astronauts who have traveled to space).

According to a March 2019 profile by the Seattle Seahawks, “Nance fought many physical battles including a stomach bug, nausea, dehydration, sleep deprivation and quad cramps throughout the week.” In an interview with Cambridge University, Nance said “I was laid low by a stomach bug… I left absolutely everything on the course while running that race."

In a post-race interview with the Seattle Seahawks, Nance stated “I believe the only limits that matter are those we place upon ourselves. Tackling big challenges teaches us that obstacles are opportunities to become a stronger version of ourselves.”

Adventure

Nance has summited peaks in numerous mountain ranges, including the Alps, Pyrenees, Scottish Highlands, Rockies, Tetons, Cascades, Olympics, and Tibetan Highlands. In September 2013, Sue Shellenbarger of the Wall Street Journal noted Nance's "avid interest in mountain climbing." During a January 2017 profile, Josh Kerns of KIRO Radio described Nance as a "world-class mountaineer." In an interview with Cambridge University in August 2014, Nance compared mountaineering to business: "You absolutely cannot get to the top of that mountain unless you’re putting one foot in front of the other, over and over again. The same is broadly true in entrepreneurship."

Nance grew up on the shores of Washington's Puget Sound and has been an open water swimmer since boyhood. He has crossed some of the world's major rivers including the Nile (Egypt), Thames (UK), Seine (France), Douro (Portugal), Huangpu (China), Moskva (Russia), and Jordan (Israel). He has also swum the Persian Gulf, Aegean, Andaman, Marmara, Mediterranean, and East and South China seas.

Previously, Nance boxed welterweight for the varsity team at Cambridge University and won his debut as a British amateur in 2012. The Cambridge student newspaper credited "Nance's wise use of his height advantage" along with "arrow straight punches" and "stamina" for his victory.

References

1988 births
American company founders
American mountain climbers
American male ultramarathon runners
Mountain climbers from Seattle
University of Chicago alumni
Alumni of Fitzwilliam College, Cambridge
Living people
Track and field athletes from Seattle